Jan Spivey Gilchrist is an African-American author, illustrator, and fine artist from Chicago, Illinois. She is most well known for her work in children's literature, especially illustrations in The Great Migration: Journey to the North, Nathaniel Talking, and My America. Her books have received numerous awards including the Coretta Scott King Medal for Illustration and the Parents' Choice Award.

Early life
Jan Spivey Gilchrist was born February 15, 1949, in Chicago, Illinois, to Charles and Arthric Spivey. Gilchrist first began drawing as a young girl when she suffered from a debilitating bone disease, which prevented her from physical activities. Charles Spivey, a minister, encouraged his daughter's love of art at a young age and together, they would travel from their South Side neighborhood to visit the Art Institute of Chicago. Once there, Gilchrist longed to see art created by and featuring African Americans. Young Gilchrist was devastated by the lack of such a section. Looking back, she recounts "So I decided to change everything. I was going to make sure that African Americans were in paintings and books." With her passion for art and practical advice from her father to find a more stable profession, Gilchrist enrolled at Eastern Illinois University. She studied with the hopes of teaching and graduated with a Bachelor of Science in art education in 1973. After graduation, she worked for several years as a substitute teacher and later, as an art teacher with various public school systems including the Chicago Board of Education (1973-1976), Harvey Schools (1976-1979), Cambridge School Department (1980-1981), and Joliet Public Schools (1982-1983). During her time teaching, Gilchrist enrolled at the University of Northern Iowa, eventually graduating with a Master of Art in Painting in 1979. She also holds an M.F.A. in writing from Vermont College and a Ph.D. in English from Madison University.

During her undergraduate program, Gilchrist married Arthur Johnson on August 1, 1970. A daughter was born of the marriage. Gilchrist and Johnson divorced in August 1980. Gilchrist married Kelvin Keith Gilchrist on September 5, 1983. Gilchrist's second child, William Kelvin, was born.

Career 
Throughout her teaching career, Gilchrist continued to paint and exhibit her work. Eventually, she made the acquaintance of Eloise Greenfield, a published author of African American children's literature. Impressed by her depiction of normal African American families, Gilchrist gifted Greenfield slides of her work and a picture of herself. Greenfield suggested, after seeing Gilchrist's work, that she should become an illustrator. Soon after, Gilchrist met with editors at Philomel Books, a New York-based publishing house, to work as an illustrator.

Gilchrist has since worked with three generations of Greenfield's family. Gilchrist's first published book was 1988's Children of Long Ago, written by Greenfield's mother Lessie Blanche (née Jones) Little. Greenfield & Gilchrist published their first collaboration, the book Nathaniel Talking, in 1989. They have published 27 works together to date. Greenfield credits their productive and prolific working relationship to the mutual respect they have for each other's work and artistic processes. Gilchrist has also collaborated on two books, The Baby (1994) and Waiting for Christmas (1996) with Greenfield's daughter Monica Greenfield.

Since her first publication, Gilchrist has worked on 73 other children's books. Though she has primarily worked as an illustrator for other authors, Gilchrist has written and self-illustrated several books.  Her first authored book, Indigo and Moonlight Gold, captured a young African American girl's realization of the passage of time. It was published in 1993. Her second, Madelia, published in 1997, tells the story of a young African American girl who would rather get lost in her painting than attend her father's sermons in church.

She continues to write and illustrate children's books from her home near Chicago, Illinois.

Illustration style 
Gilchrist works in a variety of mediums, including watercolor, mixed-media collage, gouache, pastels and pencil. Many of the books she has worked on focus on the African-American experience over time and depict a diverse range of people, such as slaves in the United States, modern-day children participating in everyday activities, and well-known figures such as Barack Obama and Michael Jordan.

In Nathaniel Talking, Gilchrist used large charcoal drawings to illustrate and romanticize the moods and happenings of the eponymous character, Nathaniel. Gilchrist's soft charcoal illustrations are also seen in Children of Long Ago. Gilchrist has also used collage to great success in The Great Migration: Journey to the North where portraits of travelers are interspersed with photographs, newspaper headlines, maps, and small painted vignettes. Watercolor images were used in The Girl Who Buried Her Dreams in a Can, an autobiographical account of a girl's journey to education in rural Zimbabwe.

Gilchrist's collaborator, Eloise Greenfield, has described Gilchrist's style as thoroughly emotional with particular attention paid to the expressive nature of her character's eyes. Gilchrist has consistently used human models to realistically portray these characters and the often, everyday occurrences of their lives.

Legacy and awards 
Gilchrist is a prolific artist and illustrator in a variety of mediums, with praise given to her works in watercolor, pen, marker, pencil, gouache, and oil. Her art is included in permanent collections at the Du Sable Museum of African American History, the Isobel Neal Gallery, the Evanston Art Center Coop Gallery, and the Southside Community Art Center.  Her work is also held in the de Grummond Collection at the University of Southern Mississippi and the Kerlan Collections of the University of Minnesota. Exhibitions of her work have been held at the Anacostia Museum of the Smithsonian Museums, the King-Tisdell Foundation Museum, the Art Institute of Chicago, the St. Louis Museum of Art, the Museum of the National Center of African American Artists, and the Ward-Nasse Gallery.

She received the 1990 Coretta Scott King Award for her illustrations in Nathaniel Talking (cowritten with Eloise Greenfield), and their collaboration on Night on Neighborhood Street earned Gilchrist a Coretta Scott King Illustrator Honor award in 1992 and was also selected as a Reading Rainbow Book. Gilchrist received the Zora Neale Hurston Award from the National Association of Black Storytellers in 2014. Her work has also been recognized by the Cooperative Children's Book Center (CCBC) at the University of Wisconsin, the National Association for the Advancement of Colored People (NAACP), and Parents' Choice. Her body of work led to her induction into the Society of Illustrators in 2001 and the International Literary Hall of Fame for Writers of African Descent in 1999.

List of works

Author and illustrator 

 Indigo and Moonlight Gold (1993) 
 Madelia (1997) 
 My America (2007) 
 Obama: The Day the World Danced (2010) 
 A Voice As Soft as a Honeybee's Flutter: Inspired by Psalm 46 (2019) 
 You See Me, God: Inspired by Psalm 139 (2020)

Illustrator only 

 Children of Long Ago (by Lessie Jones Little, 1988) 
 Nathaniel Talking (by Eloise Greenfield, 1989) 
 Night on Neighborhood Street (by Eloise Greenfield, 1991) 
 Lisa's Daddy & Daughter Day (by Eloise Greenfield, 1991) 
 Daddy And I (by Eloise Greenfield, 1991) 
 Big Friend, Little Friend (by Eloise Greenfield, 1991) 
 I Make Music (by Eloise Greenfield, 1991) 
 My Doll Keshia (by Eloise Greenfield, 1991) 
 Red Dog Blue Fly: Football Poems (by Sharon Bell Mathis, 1991) 
 Everett Anderson's Christmas Is Coming (by Lucille Clifton, 1993) 
 First Pink Light (by Eloise Greenfield. Gilchrist illustrated the 1993 reprint but not the original 1976 edition) 
 Aaron & Gayla's Counting Book (by Eloise Greenfield, 1993) 
 William and the Good Old Days (by Eloise Greenfield, 1993) 
 Aaron & Gayla's Alphabet Book (by Eloise Greenfield, 1993) 
 The Baby (by Monica Greenfield, 1994) 
 Lift Ev'ry Voice and Sing (by James Weldon Johnson, 1995) 
 Recycling Dump (by Andrea Butler, 1995) 
 Sharing Danny's Dad (by Angela Shelf Medearis, 1995) 
 Waiting for Christmas (by Monica Greenfield, 1996) 
 For the Love of the Game: Michael Jordan and Me (by Eloise Greenfield, 1997) 
 Singing Down the Rain (by Joy Cowley, 1997) 
 Kia Tanisha (by Eloise Greenfield, 1997) 
 Kia Tanisha Drives Her Car (by Eloise Greenfield, 1997) 
 Lemonade Sun and Other Poems (by Rebecca Kai Dotlich, 1998) 
 Easter Parade (by Eloise Greenfield, 1998) 
 Water, Water (by Eloise Greenfield, 1999) 
 Angels (by Eloise Greenfield, 1998) 
 Sweet Baby Coming (by Eloise Greenfield, 2000) 
 I Can Draw A Weeposaur and Other Dinosaurs (by Eloise Greenfield, 2001) 
 Mimi's Tutu (by Tynia Thomassie, 2002) 
 How They Got Over: African Americans and the Call of the Sea (by Eloise Greenfield, 2002) 
 Honey I Love (by Eloise Greenfield. Gilchrist illustrated the 2003 edition, the original was published in 1978 as an unillustrated poem, 2003) 
 In The Land of Words (by Eloise Greenfield, 2003) 
 Me & Neesie (by Eloise Greenfield. Gilchrist illustrated the 30th anniversary edition in 2004 but not the original 1975 edition) 
 A Friend From Galilee (by Dandi Daley Mackall, 2004) 
 Christmas Soup (by Alice Faye Duncan and Phyllis Dooley, 2005) 
 When the Horses Ride By: Children in the Times of War (by Eloise Greenfield, 2006) 
 The Friendly Four (by Eloise Greenfield, 2006) 
 Brothers Sisters: Family Poems (by Eloise Greenfield, 2008) 
 Yafi's Family: An Ethiopian Boy's Journey of Love, Loss, and Adoption (by Linda Pettitt, 2010) 
 The Great Migration (by Eloise Greenfield, 2010) 
 Secrets of the Seven Stars: Elly's Awakening (by Kelley Powell Barcellona, 2014) 
 My God Is Awesome (by Kyla McKenzie & Monique McKenzie, 2014) 
 The Girl Who Buried Her Dream in a Can (by Terarai Trent, 2015) 
 One Last Word: Wisdom from the Harlem Renaissance (by Nikki Grimes, Cozbi A. Cabrera, R. Gregory Christie, Pat Cummings, Ebony Glenn, E.B. Lewis, and Frank Morrison, 2017) 
 We Are Shining (by Gwendolyn Brooks, 2017) 
 The Thumbtack Dancer (by Leslie Tyron, 2017) 
 The Boss: Entrepreneurship for Kids (by Robert D. Blackwell, Sr., 2018) 
 Kringle's Christmas (by Savy Leiser, 2018)

References

1949 births
Living people
20th-century American women writers
20th-century American writers
21st-century American women writers
American children's writers
American women illustrators
American children's book illustrators
Eastern Illinois University alumni
University of Northern Iowa alumni
Vermont College of Fine Arts alumni
20th-century African-American women writers
20th-century African-American writers
21st-century African-American women writers
21st-century African-American writers